Suman Dutta, also spelled Suman Datta, is an Indian former professional footballer who plays as a central defensive midfielder. Currently he is assistant manager of I-League club Real Kashmir FC.

During his career, Suman has played for the Kolkata football giants, Mohun Bagan.

Career Highlights

Starting his professional career at the age of 16, you can see how much he has achieved till 
now and how much experiences he has gained down the line in his career. With a lot of ups 
and downs in his career, Suman wants to get back up in the top league and show the entire 
country what he has got and how valuable he is. Suman is a very hard working man and never 
gives up. Although he is 31 years old, he has the will power of a warrior and wants to get back 
up in the top league of India. He faced a terrible time between 2015-16 where he was called 
by Sporting Club De Goa to sign for them but suddenly the team was closed and he had no 
club to play for in that time because of which he couldn’t play in national league of India for 
2 years but now he is back in I-League 2 and is working hard to get back up.

Achievements

Player

● Went Norway, Sweden, Denmark & Germany with Kolkata Mayor’s Eleven India at the 
age of 17

● Debut appearance in I-League for Tollygunge at the age of 16, since then been professional footballer.

● Winner of Federation Cup with Mohun Bagan 2006-07

● IFA Shield Champion with Mohun Bagan 2006-07

● Super Cup Champion with Mohun Bagan 2006-07

● Appearance in AFC Cup with Mohun Bagan in Malaysia, Singapore and Thailand 2006-07

● Santosh Trophy Runners up with West Bengal 2007

● Kolkata Premier League Champion with Mohun Bagan 2007-08

Manager
IFA Shield

Winners (2): 2020, 2021

References 

1 = https://www.goal.com/en-india/news/2292/editorials/2011/09/13/2662811/i-league-club-analysis-mohun-bagan-athletic-club-the, I-League Club Analysis: Mohun Bagan Athletic Club - The Mariners

2 = https://www.anandabazar.com/sport/real-kashmir-fc-can-change-kashmir-football-with-a-draw-today-dgtl-1.808153 / রক্তাক্ত কাশ্মীর ঘুরে দাঁড়াতে চায় ফুটবলকে অস্ত্র করে, আনন্দবাজার পত্রিকা

3 = https://m.timesofindia.com/sports/football/top-stories/pride-of-the-valley-real-kashmir-fc-has-a-bengali-connection/articleshow/67273038.cms

Association football midfielders
Indian footballers
People from Nadia district
Footballers from West Bengal
1987 births
Living people
Real Kashmir FC players
Tollygunge Agragami FC players